Badla is a 2019 Indian Hindi-language mystery thriller film directed by Sujoy Ghosh and starring Amitabh Bachchan, Taapsee Pannu, Tony Luke and Amrita Singh. The film is produced by Warner Bros. Pictures, Red Chillies Entertainment and Azure Entertainment and is a remake of the 2016 Spanish film The Invisible Guest. The story follows an interview between a lawyer and a businesswoman, in which the latter insists that she is being wrongfully framed for the murder of her lover.

At the 65th Filmfare Awards, Badla received 4 nominations, including Best Supporting Actress (Singh).

Plot
Naina Sethi is a young and shrewd successful businesswoman in London with a perfect family. Her world turns upside down when she gets arrested for the murder of her secret lover, Arjun. Naina's lawyer, Jimmy Punjabi, hires prestigious defence attorney Badal Gupta to defend her, and over the course of one late evening, they work together to find out what actually happened. Badal reveals that there is a witness whose testimony will incriminate her in the crime. Naina explains that she and Arjun were blackmailed by someone for their extramarital affair. They were called to a hotel where Naina was attacked; only to wake and find Arjun dead with the money meant for the blackmailer. She was arrested but is out on bail. The police find no trace of anyone else being present in the room or breaking in.

Badal tells Naina that she is not being honest with him and questions her about the disappearance of a young man near the hotel. Naina reveals that she and Arjun went to a cabin in the woods few months ago. On the way back, she accidentally crashed into an oncoming car and killed its driver, a young boy named Sunny. Arjun convinced Naina not to inform the police, and they removed any trace of the crime. They put Sunny's body in the trunk of his car, which Naina dumped in a swamp. While Arjun was waiting for her, Rani and Nirmal, a local couple, met and invited him to their home, where Arjun discovered that they are Sunny's parents. When Rani called Sunny, his phone rang in Arjun's pocket as he had forgotten to dispose of it, making Rani suspicious. Arjun and Naina get away but become worried that they will be discovered soon.

Naina watched the news showing that Sunny had embezzled money from the bank where he was working before disappearing. She learned that Arjun had taken Sunny's wallet as they disposed of the body and used his girlfriend's employee credentials to hack into the bank to frame Sunny as a criminal. Rani identifies Naina's car at the scene of her son's disappearance, making her a suspect, but Naina has her lawyer falsify an alibi. The police buy it, but Rani is unconvinced. Rani later confronts Naina at a press event and reveals that she knows the truth. She pleads Naina to tell her Sunny's location but Naina keeps up her act of innocence. A few months later, Arjun and Naina are contacted by the blackmailer, leading to the present events.

Badal decides that Rani must have killed Arjun and could have easily done so since Sunny's father, Nirmal, works at the hotel. Naina reveals that she saw Rani in the room but lied to check whether Badal was a good lawyer or not, to which Badal reveals there was no witness and he was lying to get the truth from Naina. However, Naina who now trusts Badal, reveals a secret: Sunny was still alive in the trunk before she disposed of the car. However, she let him drown, deciding not to save him to protect herself from potential incrimination. Surprised by her murderous and selfish actions, Badal proposes an alternate sequence of events in which Naina was the one who actually pressured Arjun into hiding the crime and framed Sunny. In this version, Arjun grew so guilty that he traveled to the hotel to confess the truth to Rani and Nirmal, prompting Naina to kill him. With the police knocking, she decided to injure herself and frame Rani for the crime. Naina denies this and claims that what Badal proposed earlier is the truth.

Badal refuses to fight Naina's case. When she implores him for help, he agrees only if she honestly tells him whether she killed Arjun. Naina confesses to Arjun's murder, revealing where Sunny's body is. Badal agrees to continue defending her and excuses himself for a moment, going out to get some fresh air while Naina receives a call from Jimmy. She realises that Badal's pen is interfering with the call. Naina then discovers that the person who came to her as Badal Gupta was an imposter when she finds the real Badal Gupta at the doorstep. Naina, shocked, takes apart Badal's pen to reveal a voice recorder inside that recorded every word of their meeting, including her confessions of both murders. As she glances outside her window, Naina makes eye contact with the imposter and Rani in the apartment building across from hers. "Badal" takes off his disguise, revealing himself to be Nirmal. Rani calls the police for Naina's arrest.

Cast
 Amitabh Bachchan as Advocate Badal Gupta (both real and disguised) / Nirmal "Nimbi" Singh Toor (in the last scene)
 Taapsee Pannu as Naina Sethi
 Amrita Singh as Rani Kaur Toor (Nimbi's wife and Sunny's mother)
 Tony Luke as Arjun Joseph aka "Ajay" (Naina's secret lover)
 Manav Kaul as Jimmy Punjabi (Naina's lawyer and college friend)
 Tanveer Ghani as Nirmal "Nimbi" Singh Toor (Rani's husband and Sunny's father)
 Denzil Smith as Detective Sodhi
 Antonio Aakeel as Sunny Singh Toor (Rani and Nimbi's son)
 Shome Makhija as Sunil Sethi (Naina's husband)
 Elena Fernandes as Glen Mohr Hotel receptionist

Filming 
The principal photography of the film began on 14 June 2018 in Glasgow, Scotland.

Marketing and release 
On 11 February 2019, Shah Rukh Khan, whose production house Red Chillies Entertainment is producing the film, tweeted two first look posters of the film, one with Bachchan's character and another with Pannu's. The film was released on International Women's Day, 8 March 2019 and is available online on Netflix. The film was certified by British Board of Film Classification with runtime of 118 minutes.

Promotional videos
Three unplugged innovative promotional videos which involved a conversation between Shah Rukh Khan and Amitabh Bachchan were launched on 3 March 2019, 6 March 2019 and 9 March 2019 respectively, which also featured Taapsee Pannu, to promote the film.

Dialogue promos
"Main Sach Hi Toh Bol Rahi Hoon" was published on 25 February 2019, "Homework" on 28 February 2019, "Sab Ka Sach Alag Alag Hota Hai" on 1 March 2019 and "Mere Paas Teen Sawaal Hain" was published on 7 March 2019 on YouTube, featuring Amitabh Bachchan and Taapsee Pannu respectively.

Soundtrack 

The music of the film is composed by Amaal Mallik, Anupam Roy and Clinton Cerejo while the lyrics are penned by Kumaar, A. M. Turaz, Siddhant Kaushal, Manoj Yadav, Anupam Roy and Jizzy. Amitabh Bachchan, inspired by Ranveer Singh's Gully Boy, rapped the song "Aukaat".

Reception

Critical response
Gaurang Chauhan reviewing for Times Now rates the film with 3.5 stars out of 5 and opines that Sujoy Ghosh has delivered yet another interesting, enticing and an edge-of-the-seat mystery thriller. Rachit Gupta of The Times of India also rates the film with 3.5 stars out of 5 and finds that the film is a slick-but-predictable thriller with solid performances. He said, "Sujoy Ghosh’s Badla delivers solid thrills and some genuine twists with great effect." He feels that this whodunit film, keeps the viewer engaging and constantly guessing about the big reveal. Cinema200 too gave it 3.5 stars out of 5 and praised the climax along with Sujoy Ghosh's direction. Anupama Chopra of Film Companion gives 2.5 stars out of 5 with remarks, "Nothing is what it seems and there are many turns, but the film isn’t as clever as it thinks it is." and concludes the review as "Badla remains watchable until the end but it doesn’t become essential viewing." Saibal Chatterjee of NDTV giving it 3 stars out of 5, finds Amitabh Bachchan classy and Taapsee Pannu right on button in edgy thriller. Taran Adarsh gave the film 3.5 stars out of 5 and found the film and its star-cast, captivating and brilliant.

Box office 
In its opening weekend, Badla collected 273.8 million from domestic market. The film had a worldwide gross collection of 138.49 crore consisting of domestic gross of 103.88 crore and overseas gross of 34.61 crore.

Accolades

See also 
The Invisible Guest  
Evaru

References

External links
 
 
 

2019 films
Indian remakes of Spanish films
2010s Hindi-language films
2010s mystery thriller films
Films scored by Anupam Roy
Films scored by Amaal Mallik
Films scored by Clinton Cerejo
Indian mystery thriller films
Red Chillies Entertainment films
Warner Bros. films
Films shot in London
Films directed by Sujoy Ghosh
Films set in hotels